Rocky Creek Bridge is a reinforced concrete open-spandrel arch bridge on the Big Sur coast of California, built in 1927, it's official name is Ben Jones, referred toas Rocky Creek Bridge  features a reinforced-concrete, open-spandrel, fixed, parabolic-arch, a decorative cantilevered walkway, and reinforced-concrete railings in an arched-window design. Rocky Creek Bridge is one of seven similar bridges along State Route 1 known as the Big Sur Arches, it is individually eligible for the National Register of Historic Places under Criterion A for providing important crossings for the Carmel-San Simeon Highway, originally State Route 56 (now State Route 1), and under Criterion C as an outstanding example of modern concrete arch construction with heavily inflected piers, and thin arch rings and spandrels As its name implies, it spans Rocky Creek. A turnout with limited parking space exists to the northwest of the bridge, for tourist use.

The vicinity ecology is noteworthy in that the marine waters at the mouth of Rocky Creek are a habitat for the endangered southern sea otter, E. l. nereis.  Additionally, on a ridge above Rocky Creek is one of the few known habitats of Yadon's piperia, a North American rare and endangered species of orchid.

References

Bridges in Monterey County, California
California State Route 1
Concrete bridges in California
Road bridges in California
Bridges completed in 1932
1932 establishments in California
Open-spandrel deck arch bridges in the United States
Big Sur